Alain Guillerm (9 April 1944 – 25 June 2005) was a French historian.

1944 births
2005 deaths
French communists
Writers from Paris
Unified Socialist Party (France) politicians
French male writers